Welcome to My Life may refer to:

 Welcome to My Life, 2004 song by Simple Plan
 Welcome to My Life, 2009 song by Sunrise Avenue
 Welcome to My Life (documentary), 2017 documentary about Chris Brown
 Welcome to My Life (Empire of the Sun song), 2016 song by Australians electronic music duo Empire of the Sun
 Welcome to My Life (Jonathan Fagerlund song), 2009 song by Swedish singer Jonathan Fagerlund during Melodifestivalen 2009 taken from his album Welcome to My World
 Welcome to My Life (Pilot), 2015 pilot by American animator Elizabeth Ito for Cartoon Network